The 2018–19 Moldovan Cup was the 28th season of the annual Moldovan football cup competition. It began with the preliminary round on 12 May 2018, and concluded with the final on 22 May 2019. Milsami Orhei were the defending champions.

Format and Schedule
The preliminary round and the first two rounds proper are regionalised to reduce teams travel costs.

Participating teams
The following teams are qualified for the competition.

Number in brackets denote the level of respective league in Football in Moldova. Teams in bold continue to the next round of the competition.

Preliminary round
14 clubs from the Divizia B entered this round. Teams that finished higher on the league in the previous season played their ties away. 13 clubs from the Divizia B received a bye for the preliminary round. Matches were played on 12 May 2018.

First round
20 clubs from the Divizia B and 12 clubs from the Divizia A entered this round. In a match, the home advantage was granted to the team from the lower league. If two teams are from the same division, the team that finished higher on the league in the previous season played their tie away. Matches were played on 25 and 26 May 2018.

Second round
The 16 winners from the previous round entered this round. In a match, the home advantage was granted to the team from the lower league. If two teams are from the same division, the team that finished higher on the league in the previous season played their tie away. Matches were played on 9 June 2018.

Final stage

Bracket

Round of 16
The 8 winners from the previous round and 8 clubs from the Divizia Națională entered this round. The home teams in the first legs and the pairs were determined in a draw held on 13 June 2018. The first legs were played on 20 June 2018 and the second legs on 5,6 and 7 July 2018.

|}

First leg

Second leg

Quarter-finals
The 8 winners from the previous round entered the quarter-finals. The home teams in the first legs were determined in a draw held on 16 July 2018. The first legs were played on 26 September 2018 and the second legs on 31 October 2018.

|}

First leg

Second leg

Semi-finals
The 4 winners from the previous round entered the semi-finals. The home teams in the first legs were determined in a draw held on 4 December 2018. The first legs were played on 16 and 17 April 2019 and the second legs on 7 and 8 May 2019.

|}

First leg

Second leg

Final

The final was played on Wednesday 22 May 2019 at the Zimbru Stadium in Chișinău. The "home" team (for administrative purposes) was determined by an additional draw held on 9 May 2019.

References

External links
Cupa Moldovei on soccerway

Moldovan Cup seasons
Moldova